Aly Abou Eleinen (born 1 January 2000 in Alexandria) is an Egyptian professional squash player. As of March 2023, he was ranked number 32 in the world.

References

2000 births
Living people
Egyptian male squash players
21st-century Egyptian people